SEPTA Route 29 is a former streetcar and trackless trolley line and current bus route, operated by the Southeastern Pennsylvania Transportation Authority (SEPTA) in South Philadelphia, Pennsylvania, United States. The line runs between the Gray's Ferry neighborhood and the vicinity of Pier 70 along the Delaware River.

Route 29 was a streetcar line from its inception in 1913 until 1947, and a trolley bus line until 2003.

Route description
Unlike the nearby SEPTA Route 79, Route 29 runs primarily along one-way streets. Eastbound buses run primarily along Morris Street, while westbound buses run primarily along Tasker Street. The west end of the Tasker Street segment turns north at 33rd Street, then east at Dickinson Street, then south at 32nd Street before heading east to Morris Street. Recent redevelopment of the Gray's Ferry area has disrupted this pattern.

At 25th Street, a viaduct above the two streets is for a former Pennsylvania Railroad rail spur designed to serve neighborhood industries. Major intersections along this line include 22nd Street, and Broad Street and connect to Tasker-Morris Station on the Broad Street Line. The next major crossings are at 12th and 11th Streets which carry the southbound and northbound segments of SEPTA Route 23. Route 23 was also a former streetcar line that was replaced with a bus route in 1992. Passyunk Avenue runs southwest to northeast in between these two intersections.

Connections at Pier 70 include 7, 25, 64, and 79.

All buses are ADA-compliant, and contain bicycle racks.

History
Route 29 streetcar service started November 16, 1913, replacing Route 7 crosstown streetcar service on Tasker and Morris Streets. Trackless trolleys replaced streetcars on August 9, 1947.

Bus service
Along with SEPTA Routes 59, 66, 75, and 79, the Route 29 trolley bus was replaced with a diesel bus service in on February 23, 2003. This coincided with an extension of service east from Front Street to the Pier 70 Shopping Center.

A proposal to restore trolleybus service along Route 29 (along with Route 79) was considered by SEPTA in 2006, after the authority had placed an order for 38 new trolley buses for Routes 59, 66 and 75, all of which returned to trolleybus service in 2008. However, in October 2006 the authority's board voted against any further consideration of purchasing new trolley buses to allow Routes 29 or 79 to be restored, a decision that effectively eliminated the possibility that trolley bus service might return to Routes 29 and 79.

As part of a pilot program, in 2016 SEPTA placed an order for 25 new battery electric buses from Proterra, Inc. They, along with two overhead charging stations, are being purchased using a $2.6-million Federal Transit Administration grant and are expected to enter service on Routes 29 and 79 in 2017, returning electric propulsion to these routes after nearly 15 years of diesel operation.

See also

Trolleybuses in Philadelphia

References

External links
 SEPTA Route 29 (Official Map and Schedule)
 Photos of SEPTA Route 29 Trackless Trolleys

29
29
29